Heiner Oviedo (born 28 December 1988, in San José) is a Costa Rican taekwondo practitioner. He competed in the 58 kg event at the 2012 Summer Olympics and was eliminated in the preliminary round by Aleksey Denisenko.

References

1988 births
Living people
Costa Rican male taekwondo practitioners
Olympic taekwondo practitioners of Costa Rica
Taekwondo practitioners at the 2012 Summer Olympics
Sportspeople from San José, Costa Rica

Central American and Caribbean Games bronze medalists for Costa Rica
Competitors at the 2010 Central American and Caribbean Games
Taekwondo practitioners at the 2019 Pan American Games
Central American and Caribbean Games medalists in taekwondo
Pan American Games competitors for Costa Rica
21st-century Costa Rican people